Childish Things is a 1969 film directed by John Derek and David Nelson starring Derek's then-wife Linda Evans.<ref>[https://www.independent.co.uk/news/obituaries/obituary-john-derek-1157309.html Tom Vallance, John Derek Obituary The Independent' 25 May 1998] accessed 16 November 2013</ref>

It was also known as Confessions of Tom Harris and Tale of the Cock''.

Plot
An alcoholic former serviceman falls in with gangsters, then has a spiritual awakening.

Cast
Don Murray: Tom Harris
Linda Evans: Pat Jennings
David Brian: Jennings
Angelique Pettyjohn: Angelique
Don Joslyn: Kelly
Gypsy Boots: Gypsy
Rod Lauren: Rod
Leroy Jenkins: Preacher
Logan Ramsey: Mr. Simmons
Erik Holland: First Fighter
Jack Griffin: Jack

See also
 List of American films of 1969

References

External links

1969 films
1969 drama films
American drama films
Films directed by John Derek
1960s English-language films
1960s American films